Swift Communications Inc. is an American digital marketing and newspaper publishing company based in Carson City, Nevada. Swift's primary markets are resort town tabloid newspapers and websites as well as agricultural publications. Swift Communications has been noted for "being outside of the mainstream" and "drawing national attention inside the industry" for disabling commenting and implementing paywalls on most of its online newspaper's websites. Many of Swift's newspapers are heavily composed of paid advertorial "sponsored content".

History 
Swift Newspapers was founded by Philip Swift in 1975. Swift, a former executive at the Scripps League of Newspapers, exchanged his equity interests in the company for ownership of two daily newspapers. After dozens of acquisitions and mergers over the years, Swift amassed a large number of print publications and in 1991 the company began concentrating on the resort sector by launching Tahoe.com and Reno.com. In 2006, the company changed their name to Swift Communications. Swift also prints advertorials, catalogs, realtor magazines and phone book advertising.

Swift decisions draw industry attention
In November 2009 Bob Berwyn, a journalist for the Summit Daily News (SDN), wrote a column which criticized the marketing practices of Vail Resorts, one of the paper's largest advertisers. He left the SDN shortly after the writing the article for reasons unrelated to the column. This action was widely derided in the Colorado media.

In May, 2011 after gathering analytics, metrics and revenue data on their commenting platform investment, Swift reviewed the data and decided to remove the user-generated content (UGC) platform Pluck from all online newspapers owned by Swift Communications. The ability for readers to leave comments about articles was removed. Editors with Swift felt the inability of their content management software to restrict comments they did not approve of was impacting newsroom productivity and civil community conversation.

Anthony Collebrusco from the Digital News Test Kitchen at CU-Boulder's School of Journalism & Mass Communication which is involved in researching a viable means of limiting the pseudonymity and unconditional free speech of commenters on Swift's websites paraphrased Swift's policy as:

In Fall of 2011, the Aspen Times re-enabled onymous commenting for users with an active Facebook account.

Swift Communications has been accused of stifling competition and setting artificially inflated ad rates by consolidating and closing small-town newspapers. Steve Lipsher, former editor of the Summit Daily News said in 2008 that "If you're an advertiser in places like Summit County, they're the only game in town"  and in 2009, Swift-owned newspapers had 90% market share in Eagle County. Swift has also been criticized for over-charging for obituary listings.

Sale of the Company
On December 31, 2021, Swift Communications was acquired by Ogden Newspapers, a Wheeling, West Virginia-based publisher of daily and weekly newspapers, magazines, telephone directories, and shoppers guides throughout 18 states.

Media properties 

Colorado Mountain News Media in Gypsum, Colorado
Wasatch Mountain News Media in Park City, Utah
The Fencepost Company in Greeley, Colorado
Acres USA in Austin, Texas
Countryside Publications in Medford, Wisconsin
Nevada County Publishing Company in Grass Valley, California

Publications

California 

Sierra Sun
Tahoe.com
The Union

Colorado 

Aspen Times in Aspen, Colorado
Craig Press in Craig, Colorado
Citizen Telegram in Rifle, Colorado
Eagle Valley Enterprise in Eagle, Colorado
Fence Post in Greeley, Colorado
Glenwood Springs Post Independent in Glenwood Springs, Colorado
Sky-Hi News in Granby, Colorado
Steamboat Pilot & Today in Steamboat Springs, Colorado
Snowmass Sun in Snowmass Village, Colorado
Summit Daily News in Frisco, Colorado
Vail Daily in Vail, Colorado

Nebraska 

Nebraska Fence Post

Nevada 

Tahoe Daily Tribune

South Dakota 

Farmer & Rancher Exchange
Tri-State Livestock News

Utah 

 Park Record

Newspaper sales, closures & cutbacks 
In late 2008, Colorado Mountain News Media, a subsidiary of Swift, reduced their staff by 20% through attrition, retirement & layoffs, shuttering numerous small town papers.
Swift has consolidated many newspapers and closed many others:
Summit County Journal in Frisco, Colorado (no longer published)
Leadville Chronicle in Leadville, Colorado (no longer published)
Northern Colorado Tribune (no longer published)
La Tribuna in Greeley, Colorado (no longer published) was named "best weekly in the country" in 2006 but was merged with the now defunct Greeley Now newspaper for not being "economically viable" in early 2008.
Windsor Tribune in Windsor, Colorado (no longer published)
Grand Junction Free Press in Grand Junction, Colorado (no longer published)
Vail Trail in Vail, Colorado (no longer published)
Valley Journal in Carbondale, Colorado (no longer published)
Fort Collins Now (formerly Fort Collins Weekly) in Fort Collins, Colorado (no longer published)
Middle Park Times in Kremmling, Colorado (no longer published)
Tahoe World in Lake Tahoe, California (no longer published)
The News-Review in Roseburg, Oregon was sold to Lotus Media Group in 2015.
The Nevada Appeal, the Lahontan Valley News, The Record-Courier and Northern Nevada Business View were sold to Pacific Publishing Company in 2019.
Greeley Tribune was sold to MediaNews Group (MNG) in 2020.

See also
Concentration of media ownership
Online advertising
Paid content

References

External links
Swift Communications (official website)

Newspaper companies of the United States
Companies based in Reno, Nevada